Cambridgeshire is a county in eastern England, with an area of  and a population as of mid-2015 of 841,218. It is crossed by the Nene and the Great Ouse rivers. The University of Cambridge, which was founded in the thirteenth century, made the county one of the country's most important intellectual centres. A large part of the county is in The Fens, and drainage of this habitat, which probably commenced in the Roman period and was largely completed by the seventeenth century, considerably increased the area available for agriculture.

The administrative county was formed in 1974, incorporating most of the historic county of Huntingdonshire. Local government is divided between Cambridgeshire County Council and Peterborough City Council, which is a separate unitary authority. Under the county council, there are five district councils, Cambridge City Council, South Cambridgeshire District Council, East Cambridgeshire District Council, Huntingdonshire District Council and Fenland District Council.

In England, Sites of Special Scientific Interest (SSSIs) are designated by Natural England, which is responsible for protecting England's natural environment. Designation as an SSSI gives legal protection to the most important wildlife and geological sites. As of March 2017, there are 99 sites designated in the county. There are eighty-eight sites listed for their biological interest, ten for their geological interest, and one for both interests.

It is internationally important for its wintering and breeding waterfowl and waders, such as teal, pintail and wigeon. The only site designated for both biological and geological interests is Ely Pits and Meadows, which has nationally important numbers of bitterns, and has yielded sauropod dinosaurs and pliosaur marine reptiles dating to the Jurassic period.

Key

Interest
B = a site of biological interest
G = a site of geological interest

Public access
FP = access to footpaths through the site only
NO = no public access to site
PP = public access to part of site
WTPR = Wildlife Trust permit required for access
YES = public access to the whole or most of the site

Other classifications
GCR = Geological Conservation Review
LNR = Local nature reserve
NCR = A Nature Conservation Review
NNR = National nature reserve
NT = National Trust
Ramsar = Ramsar site, an internationally important wetland site
RSPB = Royal Society for the Protection of Birds
SAC = Special Area of Conservation
SM = Scheduled monument
SPA = Special Protection Area
WT = Woodland Trust
WTBCN = Wildlife Trust for Bedfordshire, Cambridgeshire and Northamptonshire
WWT = Wildfowl & Wetlands Trust

Sites

See also
List of Local Nature Reserves in Cambridgeshire
National nature reserves in Cambridgeshire

Notes

References

Sources

 
Cambridgeshire
Sites of Special Scientific Interest
Geology of East of England